Sinclair is an unincorporated village within Square Lake unorganized territory in Aroostook County, Maine, United States. The community is located on Maine State Route 162 and the western shore of Long Lake in the northeastern part of the county within the unorganized territory of Square Lake. Sinclair has a post office with ZIP code 04779.

References

Villages in Aroostook County, Maine
Villages in Maine